Mission Cobra (also known as Sidewinder in Australia and Asia) is a 1989 action arcade game developed by Joy Van and published in Australia by HES Interactive and in Brazil by Milmar. It was later published in the U.S. by Bunch Games.

Plot
As commander of a fast and powerful helicopter, the player must fight through waves of enemy aircraft and destroy their commander.

Gameplay
The game can be played by a single player, or by two players co-operatively. The player's life consists of an "Exx" counter. The player begins with 66 and this is not only health but also fuel. This will be drained constantly when flying and a large amount will be lost if hit by enemy fire. When an enemy vehicle is destroyed they leave power-ups and some refill the "Exx" counter. If the "Exx" counter reaches zero by flying the player will still be able to fly but will die instantly if hit by enemy fire.

Stages
There are three levels in the game and they all end with a boss fight. If all levels are beat the game loops and stage one will act as stage four and so on. There is no ending apart from the game over screen.

References

1989 video games
Helicopter video games
Nintendo Entertainment System games
Nintendo Entertainment System-only games
Unauthorized video games
Bunch Games games
Multiplayer and single-player video games
Video games developed in Taiwan